Marius Adamonis (born 13 May 1997) is a Lithuanian professional footballer who plays as a goalkeeper for Serie A club Lazio.

Club career
He made his Serie B debut for Salernitana on 7 October 2017 in a game against Ascoli.

On 31 July 2019, he joined Catanzaro in Serie C on a season-long loan. On 17 January 2020, he moved on a new loan to Sicula Leonzio. On 5 October 2020, he returned to Salernitana on another loan.

International
He was first called up to the senior Lithuania national football team in June 2019 for the 2020 Euro qualifiers against Luxembourg and Serbia, but remained on the bench behind Džiugas Bartkus.

References

External links
 

1997 births
Sportspeople from Panevėžys
Living people
Lithuanian footballers
Lithuania youth international footballers
Lithuania under-21 international footballers
FK Atlantas players
S.S. Lazio players
U.S. Salernitana 1919 players
Casertana F.C. players
U.S. Catanzaro 1929 players
A.S.D. Sicula Leonzio players
A Lyga players
Serie B players
Serie C players
Lithuanian expatriate footballers
Lithuanian expatriate sportspeople in England
Lithuanian expatriate sportspeople in Italy
Expatriate footballers in England
Expatriate footballers in Italy
Association football goalkeepers